The 1960 West Virginia gubernatorial election took place on November 8, 1960, to elect the governor of West Virginia. Hulett C. Smith unsuccessfully ran for the Democratic nomination, while Chapman Revercomb unsuccessfully ran for the Republican nomination.

Results

Results by county

References

External links
 Democratic primary results
 Republican primary results

1960
gubernatorial
West Virginia
November 1960 events in the United States